Cross Talk, released in 1980, is the ninth studio album by the English rock band Pretty Things.

Track listing 
 "I'm Calling" (Phil May, Pete Tolson) – 4:06
 "Edge of the Night" (May, Wally Waller) – 3:19
 "Sea of Blue" (May, Tolson) – 3:13
 "Lost That Girl" (May) – 2:50
 "Bitter End" (May, Jon Povey) – 3:16
 "Office Love" (May, Tolson) – 4:12
 "Falling Again" (May, Waller) – 3:20
 "It's So Hard" (May, Tolson) – 3:14
 "She Don't" (May, Tolson) – 4:08
 "No Future" (May, Tolson) – 4:28

Bonus tracks on 2000 reissue
 "Wish Fulfillment" (May, Tolson) – 3:05
 "Sea About Me" (May, Waller) – 3:22
 "The Young Pretenders" (May, Povey) – 4:05

Personnel
Pretty Things
Phil May – vocals
Dick Taylor – guitar
Pete Tolson – lead guitar
Wally Waller – bass, guitars, vocals
Jon Povey – vocals, keyboards
Skip Alan – drums
with:
Willy Wilson - drums on "I'm Calling" and "Falling Again"
Richard Whaley, Simon Smart - engineer

References

1980 albums
Pretty Things albums
Albums with cover art by Hipgnosis
Albums produced by Jon Astley
Warner Records albums